Marciniak is a Polish surname, it may refer to:
 Adam Marciniak (born 1988), Polish footballer
 Anna Marciniak (born 1979), Polish planetary scientist
 Artur Marciniak (born 1987), Polish footballer
 Florian Marciniak (1915–1944), Polish resistance fighter
 Michelle M. Marciniak (born 1973), American basketball player
 Ron Marciniak (1932–2020), American football player
 Szymon Marciniak (born 1981), Polish football referee
 Włodzimierz Marciniak (born 1954), Polish political scientist, diplomat

See also 
 Asteroid 10471 Marciniak, named after the planetary scientist

Polish-language surnames